Kentucky Route 361 (KY 361) is a  state highway in Hardin County, Kentucky, that runs from U.S. Route 31W in Elizabethtown the entrance to Fort Knox at Bullion Boulevard.

Major intersections

{{KYint
|type=concur
|location=none
|mile=12.657
|road=

References

0361
Kentucky Route 361